The 1992 Tour de Romandie was the 46th edition of the Tour de Romandie cycle race and was held from 5 May to 10 May 1992. The race started in Fribourg and finished in Geneva. The race was won by Andrew Hampsten of the Motorola team.

General classification

References

1992
Tour de Romandie